James Kenneth Weir, 2nd Viscount Weir CBE FRSE LLD (1905–1975) was a 20th-century Scottish peer and businessman, most famously chairing the Weir Group.

Life
He was born on 10 September 1905 the son of William Weir, and his wife, Alice Blanche MacConnachie. The family lived at Holmwood in Pollokshields.

James was educated at Oundle School in Northamptonshire then studied at Cambridge University graduating BA in 1926. He then joined the family company of G & J Weir before going to work with the General Electric Company at Schenectady in New York.

In 1931 he became Director of G & J Weir Ltd.

His father was created Viscount Weir in 1938. The title transferred in 1959 on his father's death.

From 1955 he was Chairman of the Weir Group.

In 1967 he was given an honorary doctorate (LLD) by Strathclyde University. In 1970 he was elected a Fellow of the Royal Society of Edinburgh. His proposers were Robert Silver, Alick Buchanan-Smith, Baron Balerno, Anthony Elliot Ritchie and Thomas Diery Patten.

He retired in 1972 and died on 16 August 1975.

Directorships
Weir Group
International Nickel Company
Royal Bank of Scotland
Caledonian Insurance
Scottish Television
Guardian Assurance Company

Family
He married twice: firstly in 1929 to Dorothy Isabel Lucy Crowdy, and following Lucy's death in 1972 the following year he married Mrs Dorothy Hutton (née Dear), a widow.

He had six children by his first wife, of whom William Kenneth James Weir became 3rd Viscount Weir.

Through his first wife he was related to James Fuidge Crowdy, Assistant Secretary to the Governor General of Canada and Charles Keefer, one of the prominent civil engineers of Canada.

Arms

References

1905 births
1975 deaths
Businesspeople from Glasgow
People educated at Oundle School
Alumni of the University of Cambridge
20th-century Scottish businesspeople
Fellows of the Royal Society of Edinburgh
Viscounts in the Peerage of the United Kingdom